Jelena Rowe (born August 1, 1999) is an American athlete who competes in the high jump.

Early life
From Illinois, Rowe was 6 feet tall as a freshman, then 6’3” as a sophomore and 6’4” as a junior. Rowe played a number of sports such as Volleyball and basketball before settling on athletics and the high jump.  She cleared a height of 1.85 metres at the Illinois Top Times indoor state meet on March 26, 2017, in Bloomington, Illinois and matched that height outdoors on April 22, 2017, at the Sue Pariseau Invite at Glenbard West.

Career
In February 2021 Rowe cleared 1.91 indoors for a new personal best, finishing second to Vashti Cunningham at the American Track League in Fayetteville, Arkansas. On May 22, 2021, Rowe cleared 1.96m at a meet in Tucson, Arizona. This height placed her in the top ten worldwide across all of 2021. Rowe jumped 1.91m to finish in third place at the USA Indoor Championships on 27 February 2022, in Spokane, Washington. Rowe and her training partner Vashti Cunningham opted against competing at the 2022 World Athletics Indoor Championships in Belgrade, Serbia due to restrictions around covid “athlete bubbles”.

References

1999 births
Living people
American female high jumpers
21st-century American women